Heliotropioideae was a subfamily of the flowering plant family Boraginaceae, comprising roughly 450 species. A 2016 revision of the Boraginales recognises it as a distinct family, Heliotropiaceae.

Genera
According to the 2016 revision, there are four genera:
 Euploca Nutt. (~100 species, almost cosmopolitan)
 Heliotropium L. (~325 species, almost cosmopolitan; incl. Tournefortia L.)
 Ixorhea Fenzl (1 species, Argentina)
 Myriopus Small (~25 species, Neotropics)

References

 

 
Asterid subfamilies